is a railway station in the town of Ōwani, Aomori Prefecture, Japan, operated by the Kōnan Railway Company

Lines
Shukugawara Station is served by the Kōnan Railway Ōwani Line, and lies 0.9 kilometers from the southern terminus of the line at Ōwani Station.

Station layout
Shukugawara Station has one side platform serving  single bi-directional track. There is no station building, but only a weather shelter on the platform. The station is unattended.

Adjacent stations

History
Shukugawara Station was opened on January 26, 1952 with the opening of the Kōnan Railway. In January 2002, the station was relocated 200 meters towards Sabaishi Station.

Surrounding area
Aomori Prefectural Route 201

See also
 List of railway stations in Japan

External links

Kōnan Railway home page 
 Location map 

Railway stations in Aomori Prefecture
Konan Railway
Ōwani, Aomori
Railway stations in Japan opened in 1952